Can Yoldaşları is a 1966 Turkish drama film, directed by Halit Refiğ and starring Mehmet Ali Akpinar, Suzan Avci and Nilüfer Aydan.

References

External links
Can Yoldaşları at the Internet Movie Database

1966 films
Turkish drama films
1966 drama films
Films directed by Halit Refiğ
1960s Turkish-language films

Turkish black-and-white films